Peruvian Traditions is a compendium of some of the writings of the Peruvian writer Ricardo Palma.

Introduction
The writings, which are collectively known as the Tradiciones, started appearing in 1863 in newspapers and magazines. They are short stories of historical fiction that relate events based on historical fact and that are descriptive of the way people lived in different moments in the Peruvian history. Their value as historical sources is limited, but their literary value is great.

Some of the Tradiciones peruanas have been translated into English under the title The Knights of the Cape and Thirty-seven Other Selections from the Tradiciones Peruanas of Ricardo Palma (ed. Harriet de Onís, 1945) and more recently under the title Peruvian Traditions (ed. Christopher Conway and trans. Helen Lane, Oxford University Press, 2004).

Characteristics
Some of the key characteristics of the Traditions are:
Use of popular language full of proverbs, sayings, songs and verses.
Some stories are based on historical events that are backed up by archives or documents (Palma was librarian of the Biblioteca Nacional del Perú)
Other stories with no firm historical basis are used to explain facts, such as the names of streets and houses in Lima.
Oral tone, often containing a dialog with the reader. (The writer sometimes refers to himself in the third person plural).
Critique of political, social, and religious institutions of the era.
Mostly set in Lima, but with a significant portion of the stories set in the rest of what used to be the Viceroyalty of Peru.

Publications
The Traditions were published in the following order:

1872 First part.
1874 Second part.
1875 Third part.
1877 Fourth part.
1883 Tradiciones, from the first to the sixth part recompilation.
1889 Ropa vieja, seventh part.
1891 Ropa apolillada, eighth part.
1906 Mis Últimas Tradiciones, ninth part.
1910 Apéndice a mis últimas tradiciones peruanas, tenth part.

The adjective "Peruanas" ("Peruvian") was not used by Palma. The adjective was used for the first time in 1890 on their first publication in Argentina.

There are in total 453 Traditions of which six are set during the Incan Empire, 339 during the Viceroyalty, 43 during the Emancipation, 49 during the Republic and 16 that cannot be placed within a specific period.

Further reading

Andreu, Alicia G. "Una nueva aproximación al lenguaje en las Tradiciones peruanas de Ricardo Palma". Spanish American Literature: From Romanticism to 'Modernismo' in Latin America. Eds. David William Foster & Daniel Altamiranda. New York & London: Garland, 1997: 175–190.

Bazán, Dora. Mujeres, ideas y estilo en 'Las tradiciones' de Palma. Lima: Universidad Ricardo Palma/Universitaria, 2001.
Chang-Rodríguez, Raquel. "Elaboración de fuentes en 'Carta canta' y 'papelito jabla lengua'". Kentucky Romance Quarterly 24.4 (1977): 433–439.
Conway, Christopher. "Introduction". In Palma, Ricardo, Peruvian Traditions. Oxford, Oxford University Press, 2004: xix–xxxvii;
Durán Luzio, Juan. "Ricardo Palma, cronista de una sociedad barroca". Revista Iberoamericana 140 (July–September 1987): 581–593.
Leavitt, Sturgis E. "Ricardo Palma and the Tradiciones Peruanas. Hispania 34.4 (November 1951): 349–353.
Mariátegui, José Carlos. "Ricardo Palma, Lima y la Colonia". In siete ensayos de interpretación de la realidad peruana. México: ERP, 1988: 218–227;
Mariátegui, José Carlos. "Ricardo Palma, Lima and the Colony". In Seven Interpretive Essays on Peruvian Reality. Trans. Marjory Urquidi. Austin: University of Texas Press, 1971: 195–203.
Miró, César. Don Ricardo Palma: El Patriarca de las Tradiciones. Buenos Aires: Editorial Losada, 1953.
Moreano, Cecilia. Relaciones literarias entre España y el Perú: la obra de Ricardo Palma. Prólogo de Pura Fernández. Lima, Perú: Universidad Ricardo Palma, Editorial Universitaria, 2004.
Palma, Edith. "Ricardo Palma y sus Tradiciones peruanas". Tradiciones peruanas completas. Por Ricardo Palma. Madrid: Aguilar, 1964: xvii–xl
Palma, Ricardo. Tradiciones peruanas. Eds.  Julio Ortega y Flor María Rodríguez-Arenas. Nanterre, France: Allca XXe, Université Paris X, 1996. This edition of the Tradiciones of Ricardo Palma contains numerous excellent articles about the author and his work.
Puccini, Darío. "La doble oralidad y otras claves de lectura de Ricardo Palma". Spanish American Literature: From Romanticism to 'Modernismo' in Latin America. Eds. David William Foster & Daniel Altamiranda. New York & London: Garland, 1997: 169–174.
Rodríguez-Peralta, Phyllis. "Liberal Undercurrents in Palma's Tradiciones peruanas". Spanish American Literature: From Romanticism to 'Modernismo' in Latin America. Eds. David William Foster & Daniel Altamiranda. New York & London: Garland, 1997: 153–167.
Stowell, Ernest. " "Ricardo Palma and the Legal Profession". Hispania 25.2 (May 1942): 158–160.
Tanner, Roy L. "The Humour Of Irony And Satire In The Tradiciones Peruanas". Columbia University of Missouri Press, 1986.
Tauzin Castellanos, Isabelle. Claves de una coherencia: las "Tradiciones peruanas" de Ricardo Palma. Lima : Universidad Ricardo Palma, 1999.
Vargas Ugarte, Rubén. "Don Ricardo Palma y la historia". Journal of Inter-American Studies 9.2 (April 1967): 213–224.

External links

 
 Perú. Tradiciones, Miguel de Cervantes Virtual Library

Peruvian literature
Peruvian folklore